Talkeetna Air Taxi, established in 1947 as Talkeetna Air Service, is a Talkeetna, Alaska-based flight company. It operates wheel-ski equipped bush planes, and is one of less than a half-dozen air services with a permit to land in Denali National Park. Historically, business included supply runs to remote homesteads and prospecting claims—though in the past decade traffic has been primarily tourist and climber related.

Fleet
 1 – Cessna 185
 1 – De Havilland Beaver
 6 – De Havilland Otter
 1 – Robinson R44

See also
 Air taxi

References

Further reading
 Into the wilds: Alaska's towering Denali is worth a peek - New York Daily News
 Economy worries tourism-fed Talkeetna: Tourism Industry | Alaska news at adn.com
 newsminer.com • Fairbanks, Alaska

External links
 

1947 establishments in Alaska
Airlines established in 1947
Airlines based in Alaska
Charter airlines of the United States
Companies based in Alaska
Transportation in Matanuska-Susitna Borough, Alaska